Olivia "Liv" Malone is a fictional character from the third generation of the British teen drama Skins, portrayed by Laya Lewis.

According to Lewis, "On first impressions she is the cool one of the group, she is very much laid back. Liv doesn't really care about anything, she just wants to have fun. She's that funny comment in the awkward situation. Under all that she has a lot of substance to her and her coolness is just a farce. The truth is that she is trying as much as the rest of the group to be something else. She's got balls but she really wants to be this strong person who doesn't allow herself to be hurt by others. I think Liv just wants to be loved. Liv is the hardest character to play in the group, she isn't the bitch, she isn't the vulnerable one or the funny one, she is normal." Prior to the sixth series, Lewis said, "...she comes across as being quite independent. I think she's grown up in that sense. And also, she's not a little Mini follower any more. She doesn't do that this series, which is nice.

Prior to the sixth series, Lewis said of Liv, "She's literally just being herself. I think after all the stuff last year, all the drama and stuff, she's completely forgotten about it, and I think she's grown up. They've all grown up, and they're just having fun. I think it's not really a complicated episode – not the beginning of it, anyway. They're literally just a group of friends finally just having fun without the drama, really.

References

External links
Liv series 5 profile
Liv series 6 profile
Liv facebook
Liv twitter
Liv IMDb

Skins (British TV series) characters
Fictional Black British people
Television characters introduced in 2011
Fictional English people
Fictional alcohol abusers
Fictional cocaine users
British female characters in television
Teenage characters in television
Female characters in television